John Alfray (fl. 1447–1459) was an English politician.

Family
He was the son of John Alfray II, grandson of John Alfray I and great-grandson of another John Alfray, all of whom were MPs for East Grinstead, as was his brother, Richard Alfray.

Career
He was a Member (MP) of the Parliament of England for East Grinstead four times between 1447 and 1459.

References

Year of birth missing
Year of death missing
English MPs 1447
English MPs 1459